'98 Live Meltdown is a concert album by Judas Priest, recorded and released in 1998 and is the first live album to feature new lead singer Tim "Ripper" Owens, recorded during the Jugulator World Tour. A second live album featuring Owens, Live in London, was released in 2003.

Track listing

Personnel 
Judas Priest
 Tim "Ripper" Owens – vocals
K. K. Downing – guitar
Glenn Tipton – guitar
Ian Hill – bass
Scott Travis – drums

Production
Produced and mixed by Judas Priest and Sean Lynch
Engineered by Will Shapland
Mastered by Tim Burrell
Album cover by Mark Wilkinson
Photography by Ross Halfin, John McMurtrie, Babz Bell, George Chin, and John Stone

Charts

References

Judas Priest live albums
1998 live albums
SPV/Steamhammer live albums